The Leonard House, also known as the Second Methodist Church Parsonage, is a historic home located at Greensboro, Caroline County, Maryland, United States. It is a small, -story frame dwelling with Greek Revival–influenced decorative detailing. It was constructed about 1832 presumably as the parsonage for the second Methodist church in Greensboro. The house has evidence suggestive of segregated access to servant's quarters in the loft of the wing.

The Leonard House was listed on the National Register of Historic Places in 1988.

References

External links
, including undated photo, at Maryland Historical Trust

Houses in Caroline County, Maryland
Houses on the National Register of Historic Places in Maryland
Houses completed in 1832
Greek Revival houses in Maryland
Methodism in Maryland
Clergy houses in the United States
National Register of Historic Places in Caroline County, Maryland
1832 establishments in Maryland